The  is a linear motor-powered electric multiple unit (EMU) operated by the Yokohama Municipal Subway on the Yokohama Municipal Subway Green Line since March 2008.

Formation 
, the fleet consists of 17 four-car sets with all cars motored, and formed as shown below with car 1 at the Nakayama end. The sets are designed to allow the insertion of two centre cars at a later date, hence the numbering sequence that omits cars 3 and 4.

 "xx" indicates the individual set number.
 Cars 1 and 4 are each fitted with one single-arm pantograph.
 Car 3 is designated as a mildly air-conditioned car.

Interior 
Passenger accommodation consists of longitudinal bench seating throughout. Wheelchair spaces are provided in each car.

History 
The first two pre-production sets, 10011 and 10021 were completed in May 2007 and shipped to Yokohama, arriving in June. The first full-production set, 10031, was delivered in July 2007, being hauled via JR tracks from the Kawasaki factory in Hyōgo Prefecture. The full-production sets feature a number of minor design improvements, including green-coloured gradations externally instead of the blue gradations used on the first two sets.

The trains entered service from 30 March 2008 with the opening of the Green Line.

Two second-batch four-car sets were introduced from the start of the revised timetable on 29 March 2014. These sets feature LED headlights, full-colour LED destination indicators, interior LED lighting, and 17-inch LCD passenger information displays.

Future plans 
In 2018, it was announced that ten of the 17 sets in operation would be lengthened to six cars each by 2024 as a measure to ease overcrowding on the Green Line. The first lengthened trainset is expected to enter revenue service on 24 September 2022.

Special liveries 

From 25 February 2018, set 10161 began operating in a special cream and green vinyl wrapping livery based on the livery carried by former Yokohama city tramcars to mark the tenth anniversary of the opening of the Green Line.

References 

10000 series
Electric multiple units of Japan
Train-related introductions in 2008
Kawasaki multiple units
1500 V DC multiple units of Japan